Cape St. Charles is a headland on the coast of Labrador in the Canadian province of Newfoundland and Labrador. At longitude 55°37'15" W, it is the easternmost point of continental North America.

Headlands of Newfoundland and Labrador
Extreme points of Earth
Labrador